Louise Henderson was an  English musical burlesque actress.  She appeared in productions at the Gaiety Theatre, London and at the Opera Comique in London.  She is described as a leading lady by W. J. MacQueen-Pope.

References

External links
 Entry at Picture History site

British burlesque performers
Year of birth missing
Year of death missing